The Pitcairn PAA-1 was an autogyro developed in the United States in the early 1930s. Of similar configuration to Pitcairn's earlier machines, the PAA-1 had an airplane-like fuselage with two open cockpits in tandem and a tractor-mounted engine in the nose. It was also equipped with small wings, which carried control surfaces, rather than using the rotor for flight control. It was a smaller and lighter machine than its predecessors and was designed specifically with private pilots in mind.

Variants
 PAA-1 - main production version with Kinner B-5 engine
 PA-20 - improved version with Kinner R-5 engine
 PA-24 - version with twin tails and Kinner R-5 engine, modified from existing PAA-1s and PA-20s

Specifications

References
Notes

Bibliography

External links

 "Will Autogiro Banish Present Plane?", March 1931, pg 28

1930s United States sport aircraft
PAA-1
Single-engined tractor autogyros